Texas' 1st congressional district in the United States House of Representatives serves the northeastern portion of the state of Texas. As of the 2000 Census, the 1st district contained 651,619 people. It consists largely of three small East Texas metropolitan areas—Texarkana, Texas, Longview–Marshall, and Tyler.

The 1st district once encompassed large parts of North Texas and Central Texas, but as the population of Texas grew, the district got smaller until it only encompassed about half of Northeast Texas.

For most of its history, the district was based in Texarkana, but in a controversial 2003 redistricting orchestrated by then-House Majority Leader Tom DeLay, Texarkana was drawn out of the district and moved to the neighboring . Lufkin, Tyler and Longview were added in its place.

The district was predominantly rural for much of its history, and thus was far friendlier to electing Democrats to Congress even as most of Texas swung toward the Republicans. The district's four-term Democratic incumbent, Max Sandlin, was a particularly severe critic of the DeLay-led redistricting effort, claiming that lumping rural areas with urban ones stifled the voice of rural voters. The 2003 redistricting made the district more urban and Republican, especially with the addition of the Republican strongholds of Tyler and Longview. Sandlin was heavily defeated in November 2004 by Republican Louie Gohmert, a longtime judge in the Tyler area. Gohmert is the first Republican to represent the district since Reconstruction. Proving just how Republican the reconfigured district is, Gohmert has been reelected seven times with no less than 68 percent of the vote. The Democrats chose to not put up a candidate in 2008 and 2012.

The district's best-known congressman, Wright Patman, represented the district for 47 years—the second-longest tenure of any Texan in Congress. He was an early supporter of the New Deal, and later chaired the House Banking Committee for 12 years.

2012 redistricting
The 2012 redistricting process changed the district's northern section. All of Marion County, Cass County, and most of Upshur County were removed from the district. To compensate, the eastern half of Wood County was added.

Recent election results from statewide races

Recent election results
Election results from recent races:

U.S. Representative

Demographics
 Population: 651,619 (2000 Census)
 Under 18: 26.2%
 Over 65: 14.1%
 Married 58.7%
 Non-Hispanic White: 71%
 Black: 18%
 Hispanic: 9%
 Asian: 1%
 Foreign born: 5.3%
 Language other than English: 9.8%
 Median household income: $33,461
 Owner occupied housing: 71.9%
 Income above $200K: 1.4%

List of members representing the district

See also
List of United States congressional districts

References

 Congressional Biographical Directory of the United States 1774–present

01
1845 establishments in the United States
1845 establishments in the Republic of Texas
Constituencies established in 1845